Peter Rice (born 28 February 1938) is a retired Australian rules footballer who played for South Melbourne in the Victorian Football League (VFL).

Notes

External links 

Living people
1938 births
Australian rules footballers from Victoria (Australia)
Sydney Swans players
Camberwell Football Club players